Nagar Valley is a former princely state and one of the ten districts of Gilgit-Baltistan, Pakistan. The valley is along the Karakoram Highway on the way north from the city of Gilgit. The valley is home to many high mountain peaks including Rakaposhi (7788m), Diran Peak (7265m), Golden Peak and Rush Peak.

The Nagar valley is administratively divided into two tehsils: Nagar-I and Nagar-II. All the villages of upper Nagar including Shayar, Askurdas, Sumayar, Nagarkhas, Hoper Valley, and Hispar come under Nagar-I, whereas the villages of lower Nagar including Chalt Paeen, Chalt Bala, Sonikot, Akbarabad, Rabat, Bar, Buddalas, Chaprote, Skandarabad, Jafarabad, Nilt, Thol, Ghulmet, Pisan, Minapin, Meacher, Dadhimal, Phekar, and Hakuchar are part of Nagar-II. Burushaski and Shina languages are spoken in the valley.

The Rush Lake, the highest alpine lake of Pakistan and the 27th highest lake in the world,.also lies in this valley.

Geography 
The entire region is hilly and mountainous topographically, but every part of the valley is easily accessible. The Karakoram mountain range covers the whole region, of which Rakaposhi is part. Of the total area of Nagar valley, 90% is above 3,000 meters above sea level and 30% is 5,000 meters above sea level.

History

Nagar was an independent principality for more than 1,200 years. The British gained control of Nagar during the Anglo-Brusho war, locally known as Jangir-e-Lae. Jangir-e-Lae was fought between the people of Nagar state and the troops of the British Raj at Nilt from 1 to 23 December 1891.

The British troops faced intense resistance from the people of Nagar under the leadership of the Tham (Chief) of that time, Azur Khan, at the Nilt Nallah (known as Jamila Mo Har).
The people of Nagar fought bravely for more than 20 days but were defeated due to a lack of armaments. Over 100 Nagar lost their lives and 127 were imprisoned. On the British side, four British officers and over 50 Dogra levies lost their lives. The British retained Nagar's status as a principality. Even after the revolt against the Maharaja of Kashmir and unconditional accession to Pakistan in 1948, Nagar's status continued to be that of a princely state.

During the 1960s, people start protesting against the despotism of the Mir, demanding the abolition of Begar and reduction in taxation. In 1970, they organized a march to Gilgit to register their demands authorities, while Gilgit sent scouts against the people. The scouts opened fire on the demonstrators in Chalt, killing nine people and wounding many more. The leaders of the protest were imprisoned. Later, on 25 September 1974, Prime Minister of Pakistan Zulfiqar Ali Bhutto dissolved the princely states of Nagar and Hunza, set the prisoners free and gave democratic representation to the Northern Areas Council, now the Gilgit-Baltistan Legislative Assembly.

Tourist attractions

Meadows and pastures
Nagar is home to many famous high altitude meadows such as:
Kacheli
Taghafari
Gappa Valley
Thayngi
Barkot
Bar Ter
Barpu
Sumayar Bar
Silkiyang
Hapakun
Pissan Natural Cricket Ground
Summayar Teir
Askurdas Ruen 
Rakaposhi Base Camp
Daitar 
Nagar Ruen

Mountain peaks 
Famous peaks in the region are:
Rakaposhi 
Diran
Golden Peak (also known as Spantik)
Miar Peak (Miar Chhish)
Shiltar Peak
Alchori Sar 
Hispar Sar
Kunyang Chhish
Malubiting

Lakes 
Famous alpine Lakes in the region are:
Bario Darukush lake (pakistan)
Rush Lake (Pakistan)
Snow Lake
Kacheli Lake

Glaciers 
Famous glaciers in the region are:
Hopar Glacier
Miar Glacier
Hisper Glacier
Biafo Glacier
Barpu Glacier
Minapin Glacier
Pisan Glacier
Silkiyang Glacier
Summayar Glaciers

Mountain passes
Famous passes in the region are:
Hispar Pass also known as Hispar La
Chaprot Pass
Chumar Bakur Pass

See also
Hoper Valley
Hisper Valley
Nagarkhas
Hunza Valley
Naltar Valley
Shigar valley

References

General
 Leitner, G. W. (1893): Dardistan in 1866, 1886 and 1893: Being An Account of the History, Religions, Customs, Legends, Fables and Songs of Gilgit, Chilas, Kandia (Gabrial) Yasin, Chitral, Hunza, Nagyr and other parts of the Hindukush, as also a supplement to the second edition of The Hunza and Nagyr Handbook. And An Epitome of Part III of the author’s "The Languages and Races of Dardistan". First Reprint 1978. Manjusri Publishing House, New Delhi.

Valleys of Gilgit-Baltistan
Populated places in Nagar District